Arkadiusz Janiak (born 3 October 1963 in Kalisz) is a Polish former sprinter. He won a bronze medal at the 1984 Friendship Games which were organised for the countries boycotting the 1984 Summer Olympics.

International competitions

Personal bests
Outdoor
100 metres – 10.29 (-0.4 m/s, Moscow 1984)
200 metres – 20.75 (+1.9 m/s, Sopot 1984)
Indoor
60 metres – 6.66 (Budapest 1983)

References

All-Athletics profile

1963 births
Living people
Polish male sprinters
Sportspeople from Kalisz
Friendship Games medalists in athletics
20th-century Polish people